Shimoniikappu Dam  is a gravity dam located in Hokkaido Prefecture in Japan. The dam is used for power production. The catchment area of the dam is 329 km2. The dam impounds about 49  ha of land when full and can store 6550 thousand cubic meters of water. The construction of the dam was started on 1967 and completed in 1969.

References

Dams in Hokkaido